Ziwani is a small town in Coast Province of Kenya near the border with Tanzania.

Transport
It is served by a station on the national railway system of Kenya, on the international line from Mombasa via Voi to Moshi, Tanzania.

See also
 Railway stations in Kenya

References

Populated places in Coast Province